Yuri Vadimovich Samodurov (born 27 September 1951, Moscow) is a Russian civil activist, publicist and public figure, candidate of geological and mineralogical sciences.

On the lat 1980s Samodurov was one of the founders of the historical and civil rights society Memorial, and author of its first program. From 13 January to 18 June 1993 he was acting director of the Vernadsky State Geological Museum. From 1996 to 2008 he was the director of Sakharov Center.

In 2010, Samodurov signed the appeal Putin Must Go. He is the author of articles for Echo of Moscow, Kasparov.ru and Radio Free Europe/Radio Liberty.

References

External links
 Юрий Самодуров на сайте «Люди»

1951 births
Scientists from Moscow
Living people
Russian human rights activists
Soviet human rights activists
Russian geologists
Soviet geologists
Solidarnost politicians